The R412 road is a regional road in Ireland, which runs north-south from the R448 in County Kildare to the N81 in County Wicklow. En route is passes through the town of Dunlavin where it is joined by the road from Glendalough which crosses over the Wicklow Gap.

See also
Roads in Ireland
National primary road
National secondary road

References
Roads Act 1993 (Classification of Regional Roads) Order 2006 – Department of Transport

Regional roads in the Republic of Ireland
Roads in County Kildare
Roads in County Wicklow